Ines Pianka  (born ) is a retired German female volleyball and beach volleyball player.

She was the captain of the Germany women's national volleyball team at the 1996 Summer Olympics. On club level she played with VC Schwerte.

In 1991 and 1995 she became the German Volleyball Player of the Year.

With beach volleyball she competed at the 1999 European Beach Volleyball Championships , 2000 European Beach Volleyball Championships with Stephanie Pohl. At the 2005 Beach Volleyball World Championships she competed with Jana Vollmer.

Clubs
 VC Schwerte (1994)

References

External links
http://www.bvbinfo.com/Player.asp?ID=1282
https://www.beach-volleyball.de/beach-academy/ueber-uns/die-trainer/ines-pianka.html
https://www.munzinger.de/search/portrait/Ines+Pianka/1/3449.html
http://volleyball.de/hall-of-fame/details/datum/2014/08/19/pianka-ines/
https://beach.volleyball-verband.de/public/spieler.php?id=50054

1969 births
Living people
German women's volleyball players
Place of birth missing (living people)
Volleyball players at the 1996 Summer Olympics
Olympic volleyball players of Germany
German women's beach volleyball players